Esuk Oro is an Oron Community in Oron local government area of Akwa Ibom state in Nigeria where the Maritime Academy of Nigeria and Methodist Boys' High School, Oron is located.

References 

Places in Oron Nation
Villages in Akwa Ibom